Holidays is a 2016 American horror anthology film of subversive short horror films, each inspired by a different celebration. The directors include Kevin Smith, Gary Shore, Adam Egypt Mortimer, Scott Stewart, Nicholas McCarthy, Dennis Widmyer and Kevin Kolsch, Sarah Adina Smith, and Anthony Scott Burns.

The film had its world premiere at the Tribeca Film Festival on April 14, 2016. It was then released on video on demand on April 15, 2016, prior to a limited release on April 22, 2016, by Vertical Entertainment.

Segments

Valentine's Day
 Written and directed by Kevin Kölsch and Dennis Widmyer 
 Starring Madeleine Coghlan, Savannah Kennick, Rick Peters, Britain Simons

Maxine is picked on by Heidi in the gym and nearly drowns after being pushed off the diving board by her. She is then rescued by her kindhearted coach, Coach Rockwell, whom she has a crush on. Rockwell is suffering from a heart condition and needs a transplant, and cannot do much about Heidi's bullying of Maxine because she organized a fundraiser for him. After Heidi makes fun of Maxine for her crush on Rockwell and mocking her for not being able to do anything for his ailment, Rockwell leaves a Valentine's letter in her locker to console her. Maxine finds it and becomes euphoric. She then stalks Heidi and chases her to a creek where she hits her in the face with a brick and kills her with a box cutter. Later that night, Rockwell is preparing to go out with his wife when he hears the doorbell. Upon answering the door, he is horrified by the appearance of Maxine holding Heidi's ripped-out heart as a Valentines gift for him.

St. Patrick's Day
 Written and directed by Gary Shore 
 Starring Ruth Bradley, Peter Campion, Isolt McCaffrey

School teacher Elizabeth Cullen shows her students a documentary film about St. Patrick's Day and the legend of how he rid Ireland of snakes back in his time. She also takes an interest in her new, unhappy student Grainne after Grainne leaves a dried grass snake and a note reading "Only your deepest wish can make me smile" as a St. Patrick's card project. After a night of drinking, Elizabeth awakens in her car with a snakeskin surrounding her. After she encounters Grainne in a supermarket, in which the latter embraces the former's belly, Elizabeth happily discovers that she is pregnant only to learn from the doctor that the baby will be a snake. Elizabeth finds a drawing Grainne did of Elizabeth giving birth to a snake and vomits black sludge. Throughout the course of her pregnancy, her behavior becomes increasingly strange and she refuses to listen to reason. In the final few weeks of her pregnancy, Elizabeth lies in her bathtub and places a mouse on her belly to lure the snake out of her womb. Her belly thrashes about as the snake tries to find a way out, rendering Elizabeth unconscious. She is then led away by Grainne and a mysterious man, presumably Grainne's father and the father of Elizabeth’s snake baby. The man assumes that Elizabeth will be horrified, but she happily embraces her role as the snake’s mother and joins the cult. Later, a new teacher at the school gets the same message from Grainne.

Easter 
 Written and directed by Nicholas McCarthy 
 Starring Ava Acres, Petra Wright, Mark Steger
 
While being tucked into bed at night, a little girl becomes frightened by the coming of the Easter Bunny. The mother attempts to calm her and tries her best to explain the holiday mascot's connection to Jesus before managing to tuck her in. She also tells her she has to be asleep when the Easter Bunny comes because no child has ever seen him. Later, the girl gets up to get a drink of water and discovers a Crucified Jesus/Easter Bunny-like creature leaving chicks and candies in the living room. She attempts to sneak back to her room but is caught. The Bunny explains that now she has seen him, she must take his place and that she will never see her mother again, but will see wonderful magical things. He feeds her an egg that transforms her into another bunny creature. The mother is heard calling for her daughter as the back door locks itself.

Mother's Day 
 Written and directed by Sarah Adina Smith
 Starring Sophie Traub, Aleksa Palladino, Sheila Vand, Jennifer Lafleur, Sonja Kinski

Kate can't stop getting pregnant and keeps having to abort. At the advice of her doctor, Kate attends a getaway that is out in the middle of the desert. At first, everything seems fine until one night she is involved in an orgy with the women and a muscular man. The getaway turns out to be home to barren witches who are hoping to get pregnant. They tell her that she is the gateway. Kate becomes catatonic but is groomed and cared for by the witches who cut her off from contacting the outside. It turns out that her doctor who recommended the place to her is part of the coven. Eventually, Kate manages to flee but suddenly goes into labor. The women surround her to aid in her birth, but they all scream in terror when a bloody full-sized arm comes out of her.

Father's Day 
 Written and directed by Anthony Scott Burns
 Starring Jocelin Donahue, Michael Gross, Jana Karan

Carol comes home from teaching when she receives a mysterious package from her father whom she has not seen since she was a child. Carol discovers that the package is an old cassette deck player with earphones. She plays the tape which is from her father telling her how he loves her and instructing her to go to the place they played at when she was a child so they can be reunited. She leaves a voicemail for her mom stating how angry she is about lying to her about her father dying. Upon reaching the place hinted at on the tape, she realizes that the tape was recorded when she was with her father as a child. The tape provides instructions on where to go. She reminisces her memories with her father on that day. The tape eventually leads her to a building with a mysterious door which she remembers entering with her father, where he asked the woman on the reception to take care of her before leaving her. In the tape, her father apologizes for leaving her, but has to because he only has one chance to meet "him". Upon entering, it seems to lead her to another world. It cuts back to Carol's mother trying to call her cell phone, which Carol had left in her car. Carol comes across a figure sitting in a chair. The tape has her father state that he's glad she came "by [her] own free will" and, upon calling out to her father several times while crossing a circle of salt to the house, is eventually frightened by a dark mysterious humanoid that roars back at her. The tape recorder and headphones fall to the ground and Carol subsequently disappears as the end of the tape continues saying "together" in her father's voice.

Halloween 
 Written and directed by Kevin Smith
 Starring Ashley Greene, Olivia Roush, Harley Quinn Smith, Harley Morenstein, Shelby Kemper.

Ian hosts an internet sex service where he abuses his employees Holly, Bree, and Serena. When he denies the girls' wishes to celebrate Halloween and calls them derogatory names, the girls fight back by telling him that it's a mistake to mess with three women as it forms a coven. Unintimidated, he attempts to rape Serena, but the girls knock him out. Ian wakes up in his underwear, with a vibrator connected to a car battery superglued up his anus and a laptop placed in front of him. The girls send him demands through the laptop, warning him that he will be subjected to the vibrator if he doesn’t fulfill them. When they ask him to show them his vagina, he is confused. The girls slide a knife under the door and tell him to "Make it Hollow, Ian". After he does so, the girls turn up the battery's power to 10 out of curiosity, and presumably kill him. The girls answer the door to Nancy, who Ian had called earlier, about the job. The girls explain that they are under new management and that Ian is no longer with the company due to "cutbacks".

Christmas
 Written and directed by Scott Stewart
 Starring Seth Green, Clare Grant, Kalos Cluff, John C. Johnson, Shawn Parsons, Michael Sun Lee, Wes Robertson, Karina Noelle, Scott Stewart, Richard DiLorenzo

Pete Gunderson is late trying to buy virtual glasses called "uVu" for his son. A man before him buys the last remaining stock despite Pete calling about it earlier, but the man suddenly has a heart attack and can't reach his pills. At first, Pete starts to call for help, but after being reminded about his wife's demand to get the glasses, Pete instead steals the glasses and rushes home, where his wife complains about not receiving a Christmas bonus she was promised. On Christmas day, Pete's son Bobby is overjoyed, explaining that the glasses recreate your thoughts and ideas into a virtual game. On the urging of his son, Pete tries them on and sees a stripper. Later that night, Pete sneaks out of bed to try the glasses on again. At first, he sees himself receiving a blowjob from a prostitute, but after some static, the visuals suddenly switch to Pete stealing the glasses, seen from the dying man's point of view. Pete tries to hide what happened, but his wife, Sara, reveals that she saw the saved footage. Pete admits that he did it because the man "had what [he] wanted," and because he "was tired of being nice." To his surprise, Sara is turned on by this and the two have sex. Later, Pete looks through the glasses again and discovers that Sara had tortured and killed her boss after he passed her over for a bonus. Shocked, he reads the glasses' tagline: "uVu shows you YOU!"

New Year's Eve
 Written by Kevin Kölsch and Dennis Widmyer; directed by Adam Egypt Mortimer
 Starring Lorenza Izzo, Andrew Bowen, Megan Duffy

Reggie is a serial killer who targets women. After murdering his latest victim, Reggie picks up another girl through a dating site, named Jean, and goes to meet with her for New Year's Eve. Their date is awkward especially because of Reggie's weirdness, but Jean, feeling sorry for him, invites him to her apartment. They return to Jean's apartment and Reggie goes to the bathroom to wash up, though he's actually preparing to use chloroform on her. He checks the medicine cabinets and discovers that Jean keeps severed limbs and organs in jars, revealing her to be also a serial killer. Suddenly, Jean rushes in with a fire axe and attacks Reggie, who further finds corpses in her bathtub. Reggie attempts to make it to the living room and has his foot severed by the axe. After making it to his jacket, he pulls out a revolver but forgot to load it (he forgot to load the gun the first time he tried to shoot his earlier victim), resulting in Jean splitting his head open and killing him. As the New Year rings in, Jean dances with her axe.

Production
The project originated with John Hegeman and his Distant Corners Entertainment. Tim Connors and Adam Egypt Mortimer were also producing, as well as Kyle Franke and Aram Tertzakian from XYZ Films. Executive producers were Andrew Barrer and Gabe Ferrari, and Nate Bolotin and Nick Spicer of XYZ.

Release
The film had its world premiere at the Tribeca Film Festival on April 14, 2016. Prior to, Vertical Entertainment and XYZ Films acquired worldwide distribution rights. The film was released on April 15, 2016, through video on demand prior to a limited release on April 22, 2016.

Reception

References

External links 
 
 
 
 
 

2016 horror films
2010s monster movies
American horror anthology films
American supernatural horror films
American monster movies
Films about witchcraft
Films directed by Gary Shore
Films directed by Kevin Smith
Films directed by Scott Stewart (director)
Vertical Entertainment films
Holiday horror films
2010s English-language films
2010s American films